Dani Alves (born 1983) is a Brazilian footballer who plays as a rightback.

Dani Alves or Daniel Alves may also refer to:
Daniel Alves (rower) (born 1969), Portuguese rower